The 1993–94 Tunisian National Championship season was the 68th season of top-tier football in Tunisia.

Results

League table

Result table

References
1993–94 Ligue 1 on RSSSF.com

Tunisian Ligue Professionnelle 1 seasons
Tun